Karen Elizabeth Lumley (born 28 March 1964) is a Conservative Party politician in England. She was elected the Member of Parliament (MP) for Redditch in Worcestershire in the general election of May 2010, when she defeated former Home Secretary Jacqui Smith. She stood down at the general election of June 2017.

Personal life
Lumley was born in Barnsley, but grew up in the county of Warwickshire, in the town of Rugby. Her early education was at the Rugby High School for Girls, and subsequently the East Warwickshire College.

Since becoming an MP, she has lived in the area in Brockhill, of Redditch. She is married to Richard Lumley, a geologist, and has two children.

Political career
Lumley was the deputy chair of the Welsh Young Conservatives from 1986 to 1987, and the group leader of the district of Wrexham Maelor from 1991 to 1996. She also served on Clwyd County Council between 1993 and 1996, and on Redditch Borough Council from 2001 to 2003.

Lumley unsuccessfully contested the Delyn constituency in 1997 and at National Assembly level in 1999. In both the general elections of 2001 and 2005, she unsuccessfully contested the constituency of Redditch before gaining the seat at the general election of 2010, defeating the former Labour Home Secretary Jacqui Smith.

She was one of 175 MPs to vote against the Marriage (Same Sex Couples) Act 2013 in March 2013 which legalised same sex marriage in England and Wales.

Lumley had said that while she supported civil partnerships, she had felt that the bill would redefine the meaning of marriage and that her decision would be supported by the majority of her constituents. Lumley held her seat in the election of May 2015.

She indicated her support for voting to leave the European Union in the EU Referendum in March 2016. Lumley commented that the move would regain the sovereignty of the United Kingdom.

In the House of Commons Lumley sat on the Finance Committee as of July 2015. She has previously been part of the Welsh Affairs Select Committee and the Transport Select Committee. Lumley was also a Parliamentary Private Secretary in the Department of Health. Lumley stood down at the general election of 2017 due to ill health.

References

External links
Official Website

1964 births
Living people
Conservative Party (UK) MPs for English constituencies
UK MPs 2010–2015
Female members of the Parliament of the United Kingdom for English constituencies
People educated at Rugby High School for Girls
People from Rugby, Warwickshire
UK MPs 2015–2017
21st-century British women politicians
21st-century English women
21st-century English people
British Eurosceptics